Miðvágur, is a village in the Faroe Islands on Vágar. It has been a municipality until 1 January 2009 when it fused with Sandavágur into Vága kommuna.

Located on the south coast of the island of Vágar, Miðvágur is the largest town on this Faroese island. For years, Miðvágur has been known as a good location for whaling and traditionally, bells would ring with the cry "Grindaboð!" - "Pilot whale ahoy!"

History
Miðvágur has been inhabited since at least the Viking period—as excavations have demonstrated. Since these early times, there has been a local "Thingstätte" (local community council), or "Várting". The most interesting building of the village is  Kálvalíð, a house which was probably built at the end of the Middle Ages. It is the oldest building of the village and possibly of the whole Faroe Islands. Kálvalíð consists of two rooms with a turf roof, built in the traditional faroese style. Today it houses a museum.

Sports
The local football team is MB (Miðvágs Bóltfelag), founded in January 1905. The rowing club from Miðvágur is Miðvágs Róðrarfelag.

People of note from Miðvágur 

Greta Svabo Bech, Faroese singer
Beinta Broberg (1667–1752), a pastor's wife, and believed to be the model for the main character of Barbara, the best-known Faroese novel (written in Danish).
Pauli Ellefsen (1936-2012), Former Prime Minister (1981-1985)
Sverri Sandberg Nielsen, (born 1993) a Faroese rower
Rasmus Rasmussen (1871–1962), writer
Jens Christian Svabo (1746–1824), a pastor's son, who contributed greatly to the modern concept of a Faroese written language, working to standardize grammar and spelling and created a Faroese dictionary. Svabo also collected a variety of folk-tales and historical examples of the spoken dialect of Faroese on Miðvágur.

See also
 List of towns in the Faroe Islands

References

External links

Faroeislands.dk: Midvágur
The Tourist Information Centre in Vágar
Municipality of Vágar (In Faroese only)

Vágar
Populated places in the Faroe Islands
Populated coastal places in the Faroe Islands